The 33rd Golden Disc Awards ceremony was held from January 5–6, 2019. The JTBC network broadcast the show from the Gocheok Sky Dome in Seoul. Lee Seung-gi and Park Min-young served as hosts on the first day, with Kang So-ra and Sung Si-kyung on the second.

Criteria
Albums and songs released between December 1, 2017, and November 30, 2018, were eligible to be nominated for the 33rd Golden Disc Awards. The awards committee decided to eliminate online voting from the criteria of the Grand Prize Golden Disc, Best Artist, and Rookie Artist of the Year awards; the winners were determined by music sales (70%) and 30 selected music experts (30%). The award for Most Popular Artist was determined 100% by fan votes.

Winners and nominees
Winners are listed first in alphabetical order and emphasized in bold.

Sources:

Genre & Other Awards

Gallery

References

2019 in South Korean music
2019 music awards
Golden Disc Awards ceremonies